Autodesk Toxik was an interactive node based, film compositing solution developed by Autodesk Media and Entertainment, a subsidiary of  Autodesk, Inc.

History 
Autodesk Toxic is a film compositing software first released in 2007.

Features 
Autodesk Toxik includes several features such as collaboration-based workflows, dynamic page zooming (that allows faster processing when working with larger video formats), a paint module, a motion path animation, and a "Master Keyer" module. Toxik is based on modules: small extensions that allow Toxik to be adaptive. All modules were installed in Toxik 2008 by default because the module selection system in Toxik 2007 was inefficient.

Current Status 
Toxik was integrated in Autodesk Maya in 2010 under the name Composite. It is now free but discontinued.

References

External links 
 Autodesk
 Autodesk Maya

Autodesk discontinued products
Compositing software